Cliftonville is a coastal town in Kent, England.  The name may also refer to:

 Cliftonville, Belfast, an electoral ward of North Belfast, Northern Ireland
 Cliftonville, an area of Coatbridge, Scotland
 Cliftonville, Hove, a Victorian residential development within what is now Hove, East Sussex
 Cliftonville F.C., an Irish League football club.
 Cliftonville Hockey Club, a hockey club in Belfast
 Cliftonville Golf Club, a golf club in Belfast